Shigli  is a city located in the Shirhatti taluk of Gadag district in Karnataka.
Shigli's pin code is 582210, and the postal head office is Shigli.

The villages near Shigli include:
Adarakatti (8 km),
Ramagiri (10 km),
Suranagii (12 km),
Batturu (14 km),
Adharahalli (16 km).
Shigli is surrounded by Shirhatti Taluk towards the north, Shiggaon Taluk towards the west, Haveri Taluk towards the south, and Kundgol Taluk towards the west.
Lakshmeshwar, Savanur, Shiggaon, Gadag are the nearby cities to Shigli.

Transport
By rail, the Yalvigi Railway Station, Kalas Halt Railway Station are the very nearby railway stations to Shigli. However Hubli Jn Railway Station is a major railway station  from Shigli.

Demographics
Kannada is the local language here.
As of 2001 India census, Shigli had a population of 10,111, with 5,054 males and 5,057 females and 1,866 households.

Schools and Colleges in Shigli
Government middle primary school
Gss Kgm School Shigli
SS Koodalmath School Shigli
SPMB science arts and commerce college shigli

Nearby tourist places
Laxmeshwar 7 km near
Hubli 55 km near
Dandeli 98 km near
Uttara Kannada 108 km near
Badami 109 km near
Hospet 114 km near

Nearby districts
Haveri 34 km near
Gadag 50 km near
Dharwad 73 km near
Koppal 89 km near

Nearby railway stations
Yalvigi Railway Station 7 km near
Kalas Halt Railway Station 10 km near
Savanur Railway Station 14 km near
Gudgeri Railway Station 15 km near

Nearby airports
Hubli Airport 59 km near
Sambre Airport 142 km near
Dabolim Airport 200 km near
Kolhapur Airport 242 km near

References

External links
http://Gadag.nic.in/
http://research.microsoft.com/en-us/um/india/projects/computeraidedlearningsurvey/gadag.htm

Cities and towns in Gadag district